{{Speciesbox
| image = Nemotelus June 2010-2.jpg
| image_caption = Nemotelus pantherinus 
| parent = Camptopelta
| genus = Nemotelus (subgenus)
| species = pantherinus
| display_parents = 4| authority = (Linnaeus, 1758)
| synonyms = *Musca pantherinus Linnaeus, 1758Nemotelus fraternus Loew, 1846Nemotelus marginatus (Fabricius, 1775)Stratiomys marginata Fabricius, 1775
}}Nemotelus pantherinus'', the fen snout, is a European species of soldier fly.

References

Stratiomyidae
Diptera of Europe
Flies described in 1758
Taxa named by Carl Linnaeus